Modus ponendo tollens (MPT; Latin: "mode that denies by affirming") is a valid rule of inference for propositional logic. It is closely related to modus ponens and modus tollendo ponens.

Overview
MPT is usually described as having the form:
Not both A and B
A
Therefore, not B
For example:
 Ann and Bill cannot both win the race.
 Ann won the race.
 Therefore, Bill cannot have won the race.

As E. J. Lemmon describes it:"Modus ponendo tollens is the principle that, if the negation of a conjunction holds and also one of its conjuncts, then the negation of its other conjunct holds."

In logic notation this can be represented as:
 
 
 

Based on the Sheffer Stroke (alternative denial), "|", the inference can also be formalized in this way:

Proof

See also
 Modus tollendo ponens
 Stoic logic

References

Latin logical phrases
Rules of inference
Theorems in propositional logic

nl:Modus tollens#Modus ponendo tollens